Xylophaga is a genus of bivalves in the family Pholadidae.

Species 
 Xylophaga abyssorum Dall, 1886
 Xylophaga africana 
 Xylophaga alexisi 
 Xylophaga aurita 
 Xylophaga bayeri 
 Xylophaga clenchi 
 Xylophaga concava 
 Xylophaga depalmai 
 Xylophaga dorsalis (Turton, 1819)
 Xylophaga dorsata 
 Xylophaga duplicata 
 Xylophaga erecta 
 Xylophaga foliata 
 Xylophaga gagei 
 Xylophaga galatheae 
 Xylophaga gerda 
 Xylophaga globosa 
 Xylophaga grevei 
 Xylophaga guineensis 
 Xylophaga hadalis 
 Xylophaga indica 
 Xylophaga japonica 
 Xylophaga knudseni 
 Xylophaga lobata 
 Xylophaga mexicana 
 Xylophaga microchira 
 † Xylophaga mississippiensis 
 Xylophaga multichela 
 Xylophaga murrayi 
 Xylophaga nandani Velásquez, Jayachandran & Jima, 2022
 Xylophaga nidarosiensis 
 Xylophaga noradi 
 Xylophaga obtusata 
 Xylophaga oregona 
 Xylophaga pacifica 
 Xylophaga panamensis 
 Xylophaga praestans E. A. Smith, 1903
 Xylophaga profunda 
 Xylophaga ricei 
 Xylophaga rikuzenica 
 Xylophaga siebenalleri 
 Xylophaga supplicata 
 Xylophaga tipperi 
 Xylophaga tomlini 
 † Xylophaga tripartita 
 Xylophaga tubulata 
 Xylophaga turnerae 
 Xylophaga washingtona Bartsch, 1921
 Xylophaga whoi 

An undetermined species has been found in the Bissekty Formation, situated in the Kyzyl Kum desert of Uzbekistan, and dates from the late Cretaceous Period. A prehistoric species has also been reported in Alabama.

References 

 Purchon, R. D. 1941. On the biology and relationships of the lamellibranch Xylophaga dorsalis (Turton). Marine Biological Association of the United Kingdom, Journal 25(1): 1–39.

External links
 

Myida
Bivalve genera
Fossils of Uzbekistan
Bissekty Formation